Cottage country is a common name in Ontario, New Brunswick, and other regions of Canada for areas that are popular locations for recreational properties such as cottages and summer homes. Cottage country is often socially, culturally, economically, and politically distinct from other rural areas in that it is populated by a notably higher concentration of urban vacationers and residents who have an affinity for the outdoors, in contrast to more traditional rural populations, which are largely absent of "city folk," but that is less true in Western Canada. Any major population centre may have its own popular "cottage country" area.

In the Greater Toronto Area, cottage country traffic refers to traffic bound to cottage country on Friday afternoons and returning from it on Sunday afternoons. Cottage country traffic is usually extremely heavy on long weekends, such as Victoria Day in May, Canada Day on the July 1st weekend, Simcoe Day in August, and Labour Day in September, particularly on Highway 400 and Highway 11. The Ontario media has often referred to these times of the year as a "highway blitz," which also refers to the related Ontario Provincial Police efforts to step up highway enforcement on those congested roads, which often yield record numbers of fines for motor vehicle violations. 

One of the most well-known areas in Ontario cottage country is Muskoka, with its most famous lakes being the "Big Three" lakes which include Lake Joseph ("Lake Joe"), Lake Muskoka and Lake Rosseau. In the summer, cottage rentals become one of the most popular trips for families and groups alike in Ontario and while Muskoka remains the most popular destination, there are many other locations to rent a cottage in Ontario, including the Kawartha Lakes, Kawarthas, Haliburton, Parry Sound and Simcoe, which is the closest "big lake" to Toronto. The District of Muskoka, which encompasses six different municipalities within Cottage Country, sees over 3.2 million visitors annually with many of those visiting during the summer months. 

Canadian English has a regional distinction for the name of a summer recreation house. In some areas, "cottage" is used, but in other areas, terms like "cabin," "camp," "country house," and "bungalow" are preferred.

Areas commonly referred to as cottage country

The term cottage country is applied locally in vernacular use. For example, Greater Toronto residents might say, "I am heading up to cottage country this weekend," which is locally understood to be referring to Muskoka, the Kawartha Lakes, or the Haliburton area. On the other hand, a speaker from Ottawa would typically use the same phrase to denote the Rideau Lakes area or parts of the Outaouais.

Areas referred to as cottage country include:
 Prince Edward Island
 Cavendish, Prince Edward Island
 Nova Scotia
 Bras d'Or Lake
 Annapolis Royal
 Lunenburg County
 New Brunswick
 St. Andrews
 Quebec
 Eastern Townships
 Laurentides
 Outaouais
 Central Ontario, including:
 Parry Sound-Muskoka-Haliburton region
 Kawartha Lakes
 Bancroft and northern Hastings County
 Ottawa Valley
 Eastern Ontario
 Rideau Lakes
 Northwestern Ontario
 Kenora
 Northeastern Ontario
 North Bay
 Manitoba
 Whiteshell Provincial Park
 Eastern Manitoba
 Interlake
 Saskatchewan
 Prince Albert National Park
Fishing Lakes
 Alberta
 Banff, Alberta
 Canmore, Alberta
 British Columbia
 Shawnigan Lake, British Columbia
 Lake Country, British Columbia
 Whistler, British Columbia

Other popular summer vacation areas

Alberta 

According to the Realtors' Association of Edmonton official map (2010), the following are resort communities within 100km of Edmonton (clockwise starting from the east):
Antler Lake
North Cooking Lake
Hastings Lake
South Cooking Lake
Miquelon Lake
Pigeon Lake
Buck Lake
Spring Lake
Wabamun Lake
Isle Lake
Lac Ste. Anne
Sandy Lake
Nakamun Lake
Lac la Nonne

Further afield:
Sylvan Lake (Alberta)

British Columbia 
 British Columbia Interior, especially:
 the Okanagan, Shuswap Country, etc.

See also
 Beach house
 Dacha
 List of summer colonies, the term summer colony is often used, particularly in the United States
 Resort town

References

Canadian culture
Culture of Ontario